There are about 47 Government and 3 Private Grant-in-Aid degree colleges in Kashmir Division, of Indian-administrated union territory of Jammu and Kashmir as per the data available by Jammu and Kashmir  Higher Education Department. The colleges in Kashmir province are located in 10 districts. These districts include, Srinagar, Baramulla, Anantnag, Budgam, Kupwara, Pulwama, Ganderbal, Kulgam, Shopian and Bandipora. All the degree colleges of Kashmir Division are affiliated to the University of Kashmir.

District wise breakup of colleges

District Srinagar 

 Sri Pratap College
 Amar Singh College
 Women's College, M.A Road
 Women's College, Nawakadal
Islamia College of Science & 
Commerce, Hawal
 Gandhi Memorial College, Fateh Kadal
Vishwa Baharti Women's College, Rainawari
 Govt. Degree College, Bemina
 Govt. Degree College, Bagi Dilawar Khan
 Govt. College of Nursing, M A Road Srinagar
 Govt. Degree College, Khanmoh
 Govt. Degree College, Nowgam Byepass
 Govt. Degree College, Hyderpora
 Govt. Degree College, Eidgah
 Govt. Degree College, Allochibagh
 Govt. Degree College, Soura 
 Govt. Degree College, Shalimar

District Baramulla 

 Govt. Degree College Boy’s, Baramulla
 Government College for Women, Baramulla
 Government Degree College Boys, Sopore
 Women's College, Sopore
 Government Degree College, Uri
 Government Degree College, Pattan
 Govt Degree College Hadipora
 Govt. Degree College, Tangmarg                                   
 Govt. Degree College, Kreeri
 Govt. Degree College, Watergam
 Govt. Degree College, Bomai 
 Govt. Degree College, Bonier
 Govt. Degree College, Dangiwacha
 Govt. Degree College, Wagoora

District Anantnag 

Govt. Degree College,Boys Anantnag
Govt. College for Women, Anantnag
Government Degree College, Bijbehara
Govt. Degree College, Dooru
 :Government Degree College, Kokernag
Govt. Degree College, Uttersoo
Govt Degree College, Vailoo, Larnoo Anantnag
 Govt Degree College Verinag,Anantnag
 Govt Degree College Siligam(Aushmuqam)Anantnag
 Govt Degree College Chattisinghpora,Anantnag
 Govt Degree College Mattan(East),Anantnag
 Govt Degree College Achabal Anantnag
 Govt Degree College Srigufwara,Anantnag

District Budgam 
Govt. Sheikh-ul-Alam Memorial College, Budgam
Govt. Degree College, Chadoora
Govt. Degree College, Beerwah
Govt. Degree College, Charar-i-Sharief
Govt. Degree College, Khansahib
Govt. Degree College, Magam 
 Govt. Degree College, Soibugh
 Govt Degree College Waterhail,Budgam

District Kupwara 
Govt.Degree College,Boys Kupwara
Govt.Degree College, Handwara
Govt. Degree College, Tangdhar
Govt. Degree College, Sogam
Govt Degree College Women, Kupwara
 Govt Degree College Langate,Kupwara
 Govt Degree College Kralpora,Kupwara
Govt Degree College Viligam,Kupwara

District Pulwama 
Govt. Degree College Boys Pulwama
Govt. Degree College Women Pulwama
Govt. Degree College Boys, Tral
Govt. Degree College Women, Tral
Govt. Degree College, Pampore
Govt. Degree College, Rajpora
Govt. Degree College, Awantipora
Govt. Degree College, Kakapora

District Ganderbal 
Government Degree College, Ganderbal
Govt.Degree College, Kangan
 Govt Degree College, Gund
 Govt Degree College, Wakura

District Kulgam 
Government Degree College, Kulgam
 Government Degree College, Kelam 
 Govt Degree College, Dhamhal
 Govt. Degree college, Frisal
 Govt Degree College, Qazigund
 Govt Degree College, Yaripora

District Shopian 
Government Degree College, Shopian
 Government Degree College, Zainapora
 Government Degree College, Wachi

District Bandipora 
 Govt. Hassan Khoihame Memorial Degree College, Bandipora
 Govt. Degree College, Gurez
 Govt Degree College, Sumbal
 Govt Degree College, Hajin
 Govt Degree College, Tulail
 Govt Degree College, Ajas
 Govt Degree College, Mujegund

References 

RUSA Jammu And Kashmir
RUSA J&K Institutions

 
Universities and colleges in Jammu and Kashmir